The Iranian Journal of Public Health is a monthly peer-reviewed open-access medical journal covering all aspects of public health. It is published by the Tehran University of Medical Sciences and was established in 1971 by Dariush Farhud.

Indexing and abstracting
The journal is abstracted and indexed in the following bibliographic databases:
CAB Abstracts
CINAHL
Embase
Islamic World Science Citation Database
Science Citation Index Expanded
Scopus
Social Sciences Citation Index
According to the Journal Citation Reports, the journal has a 2019 impact factor of 1.291.

References

External links
 

Public health journals
Monthly journals
English-language journals
Publications established in 1971
1971 establishments in Iran